Parishia maingayi is an Asian tree species in the family Anacardiaceae. Records of occurrence include: peninsular Malaysia, Sumatra, Borneo and the Philippines; the Catalogue of Life lists one subspecies: P. maingayi minor.

This species may be synonymous with "Swintonia maingayi" Hook.f.

References 

Anacardiaceae
Flora of Indo-China
Flora of Malesia